The 2017 Australian Formula 3 Premier Series is an Australian open-wheel racing series for FIA Formula 3 cars constructed and conforming to the regulations before and including 2011.  The series begins on 20 May 2017 at Morgan Park Raceway and will conclude 22 October 2017 at Wakefield Park.  One non-championship race weekend was held at Wakefield Park starting 18 February 2017 and ending 19 February 2017.

The 2017 Australian Formula 3 Premier Series returns to the Hankook tyres for 2017. Round 1 at Morgan Park Raceway saw Calan Williams break the outright lap record.

Classes

Classes of the 2017 Australian Formula 3 Premier Series are as follows:

Premier Class 
Any F3 car from 1 January 2005 to 31 December 2011 is eligible to compete in the Premier class.

National Class 
Any F3 car from 1 January 2002 to 31 December 2007 is eligible to compete in the National class.

Trophy Class 
Any F3 car built prior to 1 January 2005 is eligible, as are other open-wheel vehicles such as Formula 1000, Formula Ford 2000, Formula Renault, Toyota Racing Series, Formula BMW, etc.

Teams and drivers

The teams and drivers of the 2017 Australian Formula 3 Premier Series All teams and drivers were Australian-registered.

Schedule
The 2017 Australian Formula 3 Premier Series schedule. All races were held in Australia.

Championship standings 

 Points system
Points for are awarded as follows:

Drivers' championship

References

See also
 2017 Australian Formula 3 Premier Series – Sporting and Technical Regulations – Version 1, www.formula3.com.au

Australian Formula 3 seasons
Formula 3
Australian
Australian Formula 3